The Swiss Class De 6/6 electric locomotives were built in 1926 for the Swiss Federal Railways. Ordered for the Seetalbahn line, which runs between Lenzburg and Emmenbrücke, they were Known as Seetal Crocodiles. In total 3 locomotives of this type were built, and numbered 15301–15303. As built they were capable of operating under dual voltage - the 5.5 kV, 25 Hz AC system in use on the Seetal line, and the national  system. The former system was removed from these locomotives in 1930, when the line was modernised to SBB national standards.

Disposal and preservation
All three locomotives were withdrawn by SBB in April 1983, with 15302 and 15303 being scrapped. 15301 was purchased by the Oensingen-Balsthal-Bahn.

See also
 List of stock used by Swiss Federal Railways

References

De 6 6
Electric locomotives of Switzerland
15 kV AC locomotives
Standard gauge locomotives of Switzerland
Railway locomotives introduced in 1926